William E. Niles (January 11, 1867 – July 3, 1936) was a Major League Baseball player. Niles played for Pittsburgh Pirates in the 1895 season. He played just eleven games in his career, having eight hits in 37 at-bats, a .216 batting average.

Niles was born in Covington, Kentucky, and died in Springfield, Ohio.

External links
Baseball-Reference.com page

Pittsburgh Pirates players
1867 births
1936 deaths
Baseball players from Kentucky
Sportspeople from Covington, Kentucky
19th-century baseball players
Dayton Reds players
Hamilton (minor league baseball) players
McKeesport (minor league baseball) players
Meadville (minor league baseball) players
Birmingham Grays players
Birmingham Blues players
Pensacola (minor league baseball) players
Kansas City Cowboys (minor league) players
Franklin Braves players
Milwaukee Brewers (minor league) players
Grand Rapids Rippers players
Grand Rapids Gold Bugs players
Springfield Governors players
Wheeling Stogies players
Sioux City Cornhuskers players
Columbus Senators players
Anderson Anders players